The First Lyashko Government was created after the Ukrainian parliament had ousted the previous government of Volodymyr Shcherbytskyi on May 26, 1972.

In 1976 the government was reshuffled.

Ministers

Chairmen of committees

References

External links
 Council of Ministers of the Ukrainian SSR

Ukrainian governments
1972 establishments in Ukraine
1976 disestablishments in Ukraine
Cabinets established in 1972
Cabinets disestablished in 1976
Government of the Ukrainian Soviet Socialist Republic